Palancar Reef is a large coral reef on the southwest side of the island of Cozumel and is part of the Arrecifes de Cozumel National Park. The site, popular with scuba divers, is divided into several sections based on depth and coral formations.

Sealife 
 Angelfish
 Barracuda
 Crabs
 Grouper
 Moray eels
 Nurse sharks
 Ocean sunfish
 Parrotfish
 Sea turtles
 Spiny lobster
 Splendid toadfish
 Yellowtail amberjack

Dive locations 
 Palancar horseshoe
 Palancar caves
 Palancar gardens
 Palancar shallows
 Palancar deep

Conservation
On September 23, 2019, the Natural Protected Areas Commission (CONANP) announced that it is temporarily closing a section of the reef from Palancar Gardens all the way around the south tip of the island. The closure is planned to be in effect from October 7, 2019, to December 15, 2019, at which point they will re-evaluate the health of the reef.

See also
 List of reefs

References

Coral reefs
Underwater diving sites in Cozumel
Landforms of Quintana Roo
Reefs of Mexico